Utmish (also Romanized as Ūţmīsh; also known as Ūţmesh) is a village in Akhtachi-ye Gharbi Rural District, in the Central District of Mahabad County, West Azerbaijan Province, Iran. At the 2006 census, its population was 394, in 70 families.

References 

Populated places in Mahabad County